Perpolita petronella is a species of air-breathing land snail, a terrestrial pulmonate gastropod mollusk in the family Gastrodontidae.

Distribution 

This species occurs in:
 Norway
 The Czech Republic
 Ukraine

References

 Bank, R. A.; Neubert, E. (2017). Checklist of the land and freshwater Gastropoda of Europe. Last update: July 16th, 2017
 Sysoev, A. V. & Schileyko, A. A. (2009). Land snails and slugs of Russia and adjacent countries. Sofia/Moskva (Pensoft). 312 pp., 142 plates

External links 
 Pfeiffer, L. (1853). Monographia heliceorum viventium. Sistens descriptiones systematicas et criticas omnium huius familiae generum et specierum hodie cognitarum. Volumen tertium [Vol. 3. Lipsiae: Brockhaus. i-viii + 711 pp]
 Schileyko, A. A. & Rymzhanov, T. S. (2013). Fauna of land mollusks (Gastropoda, Pulmonata Terrestria) of Kazakhstan and adjacent territories. Moscow-Almaty: KMK Scientific Press. 389 pp

Gastrodontidae